The 1998–99 season was Blackburn Rovers' seventh season in the Premier League, and their seventh consecutive season in the top division of English football.

Season summary
Four years earlier, Blackburn Rovers were Premiership champions. Just one year earlier, they had qualified for the UEFA Cup. They were among some people's outsiders for a title challenge.

But it all went wrong for Rovers, who were soon in the depth of a relegation battle. Manager Roy Hodgson paid with his job in November. Manchester United assistant Brian Kidd was named as his replacement, but he was unable to steer Rovers to safety and their relegation was confirmed in the penultimate game of the season. They were condemned to a place in Division One, but managed to hold on to many key players and approached the new season as most people's favourites for an immediate return to the elite.

Final league table

Results summary

Results by round

Results
Blackburn Rovers' score comes first

Legend

FA Premier League

FA Cup

League Cup

UEFA Cup

First-team squad
Squad at end of season

Left club during season

Reserve squad

Statistics

Appearances and goals

|-
! colspan=14 style=background:#dcdcdc; text-align:center| Goalkeepers

|-
! colspan=14 style=background:#dcdcdc; text-align:center| Defenders

|-
! colspan=14 style=background:#dcdcdc; text-align:center| Midfielders

|-
! colspan=14 style=background:#dcdcdc; text-align:center| Forwards

|-
! colspan=14 style=background:#dcdcdc; text-align:center| Players transferred out during the season

Starting 11
Considering starts in all competitions
 GK: #13,  John Filan, 32
 RB: #2,  Jeff Kenna, 29
 CB: #5,  Darren Peacock, 34
 CB: #6,  Stéphane Henchoz, 41
 LB: #3,  Callum Davidson, 39
 RM: #19,  Damien Johnson, 17 (#23,  Christian Dailly, has 18 starts)
 CM: #4,  Tim Sherwood, 23
 CM: #11,  Jason Wilcox, 33
 LM: #12,  Damien Duff, 25
 CF: #9,  Chris Sutton, 20
 CF: #32,  Ashley Ward, 19

Top scorers
  Ashley Ward 5
  Kevin Gallacher 5
  Chris Sutton 4
  Jason Wilcox 4
  Tim Sherwood 4
  Nathan Blake 3

Transfers

In

Out

Transfers in:  £36,250,000
Transfers out:  £11,675,000
Total spending:  £24,750,000

References

Blackburn Rovers F.C. seasons
Blackburn Rovers